The 2019 season was Kuala Lumpur's 41st season in competitive season and the 2nd season in Malaysia Super League since being promoted after winning the 2017 Malaysia Premier League.

Players

Out on loan

Competitions

Malaysia Super League

Matches
The Malaysian Football League (MFL) announced the fixtures for the 2019 season on 22 December 2018.

League table

Malaysia FA Cup

Malaysia Challenge Cup

Squad statistics

Statistics accurate as of 21 July 2019.

Transfers

In

Out

Loans in

Loans out

References

2019
Malaysian football clubs 2019 season